The Luzon narrow-mouthed frog (Kaloula rigida)  is a species of frogs in the family Microhylidae.

It is endemic to the Central Cordilleras and Sierra Madres of northern Luzon, Philippines.

The Baguio variety is divergent from the rest of the population found in the forested mountains of northern Luzon.

Habitat
Its natural habitats are subtropical or tropical dry forests, subtropical or tropical moist lowland forests, subtropical or tropical moist montane forests, subtropical or tropical moist shrubland, subtropical or tropical seasonally wet or flooded lowland grassland, rivers, intermittent rivers, arable land, rural gardens, urban areas, irrigated land, and seasonally flooded agricultural land. It is threatened by habitat loss.

References

Kaloula
Amphibians of the Philippines
Endemic fauna of the Philippines
Fauna of Luzon
Amphibians described in 1922
Taxonomy articles created by Polbot